Anna Dandolo (1217–1258) was a Venetian noblewoman who became Queen of Serbia as the third wife of King Stefan the First-Crowned, founder of the Serbian kingdom. She was crowned with Stefan in 1217, and she held this title until his death on 24 September 1228. She was the granddaughter of Enrico Dandolo, Doge of Venice. King Stefan Uroš I was her son.

Life

Origin
Anna was born in Venice, Republic of Venice, on an unknown date, as a member of the House of Dandolo, which ruled in Venice. She was the daughter of Rainero Dandolo, Vice-Doge of Venice, and Procurator of San Marco. Her paternal grandfather was Enrico Dandolo, Doge of Venice, who had earlier made incursions into Zadar (1202) and Constantinople (1204). In 1209, her father was killed in battle against the Genoese during the conquest of Candia.

Queen of Serbia
In about 1216 or 1217, she married Stefan, the Grand Prince of Serbia and son of Stefan Nemanja, in a magnificent ceremony which was celebrated in Venice and attended by all the patrician families in the republic. Following the splendid festivities held in their honour, the bridal couple were then transported with much fanfare by galley to Dalmatia. Anna was his second wife; his first, Eudokia Angelina, from whom he had separated for alleged adultery, had died in 1211. The marriage of Stefan to a woman from the powerful maritime republic of Venice was politically advantageous to Serbia; the alliance also strengthened Orthodox Serbia's ties to the west and brought a strong Latin influence to the country through the Venetian artisans who followed in Anna's wake. In 1217, Stefan was crowned the first king of Serbia by Archbishop Sava, and Anna became the first queen.

Shortly before his death on 24 September 1228, King Stefan took monastic vows. Anna lived until 1258, long enough to see her only son, Stephen Uroš succeed to the Serbian throne in 1243 following the deposition of his half-brother, Stefan Vladislav I. Stephen Uroš I married Helen of Anjou, by whom he had issue.

It is believed that Anna died in 1258. She was buried in the Sopoćani monastery, a royal mausoleum where Stefan the First-Crowned and other descendants were buried. The fresco depiction of her death is of valuable historical significance and has been described as "one of the most important historical compositions painted on the walls of Serbian medieval churches", depicted on the north wall. The work has been dated to between 1263 and 1268.

Family and legacy
Together they had one son, Stephen Uroš I, born in about 1223, and a daughter, whose name is not recorded. She also had three stepsons from her husband's former marriage.

Italian poet Gabriele d'Annunzio immortalised Anna in his 1914 Ode alla nazione serba with the line:

See also
 List of Serbian consorts

References

Sources

|-

1264 deaths
13th-century Serbian royalty
Serbian queens consort
Medieval Serbian royal consorts
Nemanjić dynasty
Republic of Venice nobility
Anna
Year of birth unknown
13th-century Serbian women
13th-century Venetian women
Burials at Sopoćani